The Syd Barker Medal is awarded to the North Melbourne Football Club player who has been judged the best and fairest of the footy season. The award has been given out continuously since 1937. Before then it was known as the Syd Barker Memorial Trophy.

The award is named after Syd Barker who was a popular captain of the North Melbourne Football Club in 1915-1919, 1921 & 1927. He was a brilliant ruckmen of his time, starring in North Melbourne's 1910, 1914, 1915 and 1918 premiership sides, and captaining the famous "Invincibles" side that went undefeated in a record 58 games.

The voting system as of the 2017 AFL season, consists of each player earning up to 20 votes in a match, with votes from their best 20 games and finals counting towards their final total.

Recipients

Multiple winners

References
General

Specific

Australian Football League awards
North Melbourne Football Club
Australian rules football-related lists